The Bennu heron (Ardea bennuides) is an extinct, very large heron from what is now the United Arab Emirates at the eastern end of the Arabian Peninsula.

Background

Found in 1977, remains of the heron have been dated to 2700–1800 BCE, coinciding with the Umm al-Nar period. It may have been the inspiration for the Bennu deity in Egyptian mythology, hence the specific name.

Extinction 
It has been speculated that it went extinct because of wetland degradation and another likely cause of their extinction would be humans overhunting their population.

References 

Bennu heron
Bennu heron
Birds of the Arabian Peninsula
Extinct birds of Asia
Holocene extinctions
Bennu heron
Fossil taxa described in 1977